The Arga-Sala (Arğaa Salaa) is a river in Yakutia (Sakha Republic) and Krasnoyarsk Krai, Russia. The river basin is a lonely, desolate area devoid of settlements.    

The name of the river comes from the Yakut language "argaa/salaa" (Арҕаа/Салаа), meaning "western tributary".

Course  
The Arga-Sala is a left tributary of the Olenyok. Its sources are in the northeastern slopes of the Bukochan Range, Central Siberian Plateau, in the Evenkiysky District of Krasnoyarsk Krai. The Arga-Sala flows roughly eastwards with rapids and riffles in numerous stretches. It flows then across a floodplain with small lakes, changing direction with southeastward and northeastward bends, but still within a generally eastward trend. The Arga-Sala is frozen between October and May.

Tributaries 

Flora and fauna
The river flows north of the Arctic circle across a lightly-wooded taiga zone. The most common trees are larches. 

Taimen, lenok, whitefish, grayling and pike are the main fish species found in the waters of the Arga-Sala.

See also
List of rivers of Russia

References

External links 
Fishing & Tourism in Yakutia
В поисках пещер древних людей на Арга-Сале

Rivers of Krasnoyarsk Krai
Rivers of the Sakha Republic
Tributaries of the Olenyok
Central Siberian Plateau